Sofia Shapatava (born 12 January 1989) is a Georgian tennis player.

She has won two singles and 32 doubles titles on the ITF Women's Circuit. On 8 September 2014, she reached her career-high singles ranking of world No. 186. On 9 November 2015, she peaked at No. 132 in the doubles rankings.

Playing for Georgia Fed Cup team, Shapatava has a win–loss record of 29–25.

She made her Grand Slam main-draw debut at the 2014 French Open, where she qualified before losing to 2009 champion Svetlana Kuznetsova in the first round.

Grand Slam singles performance timeline

ITF Circuit finals

Singles: 14 (2 titles, 12 runner–ups)

Doubles: 59 (32 titles, 27 runner–ups)

Notes

References

External links
 
 
 

1989 births
Sportspeople from Tbilisi
Living people
Female tennis players from Georgia (country)
Expatriate sportspeople from Georgia (country) in France
Expatriate sportspeople from Georgia (country) in Poland